Mycodextranase (1,3-1,4-alpha-D-glucan 4-glucanohydrolase) is an enzyme with systematic name (1->3)-(1->4)-alpha-D-glucan 4-glucanohydrolase. This enzyme catalyses the following chemical reaction

 Endohydrolysis of (1->4)-alpha-D-glucosidic linkages in alpha-D-glucans containing both (1->3)- and (1->4)-bonds

Products are nigerose and 4-alpha-D-nigerosylglucose.

References

External links 
 

EC 3.2.1